Franck Caldeira de Almeida (born February 6, 1983 in Sete Lagoas) is a marathon athlete from Brazil. He won the gold medal in the men's marathon at the 2007 Pan American Games in Rio de Janeiro, Brazil and the worldwide famous São Silvestre Road Race, in São Paulo, 2006.

References

 
  Profile

1983 births
Living people
Brazilian male long-distance runners
Athletes (track and field) at the 2007 Pan American Games
Athletes (track and field) at the 2008 Summer Olympics
Athletes (track and field) at the 2012 Summer Olympics
Olympic athletes of Brazil
Pan American Games athletes for Brazil
Athletes (track and field) at the 2015 Pan American Games
Pan American Games gold medalists for Brazil
Pan American Games medalists in athletics (track and field)
South American Games silver medalists for Brazil
South American Games gold medalists for Brazil
South American Games medalists in athletics
Competitors at the 2002 South American Games
Medalists at the 2007 Pan American Games
20th-century Brazilian people
21st-century Brazilian people